Bistrica is a village in the municipality of Nova Varoš, western Serbia. According to the 2002 census, the village has a population of 791 people.

A plastics factory is the main employer. The road European route E763 runs through the village.

References

Populated places in Zlatibor District